James Michael O'Dwyer is an inventor who grew up in Muttaburra, Queensland, Australia, chiefly known for his Metal Storm weapon.

Biography
O'Dwyer completed grade 12 education, then went on to be a manager at Woolworths Limited before his inventions were able to provide an income.

An American company Breeze Technology Holdings has the rights to one of his inventions - air-cooled sneakers.

Metal Storm

O'Dwyer spent 15 years developing a rapid-fire gun prototype called Metal Storm that uses stacked projectiles. Metal Storm can fire up to 1,000,000 rounds per minute, or 16,000 rounds per second, and was declared by Guinness Book of Records to be the world's most intelligent and fastest firearms.
The technology was being commercialised by a company also called Metal Storm, but they requested their shares be suspended from trading on 20 July 2012 and later was placed in voluntary administration.

In late 2015 DefendTex, an Australian-based defence R&D company acquired the intellectual property, trademarks and other assets of Metal Storm.

References

External links
Transcript of interview with Mike O'Dwyer and others in 2000 (ABC)
Mike appeared on Nine Network's Sunday program
SMH
ABC, 31 August 2000

Year of birth missing (living people)
Living people
21st-century Australian inventors
Weapon designers